Stephen Brockwell is a Canadian poet.

Life

Brockwell lives and works in Ottawa. He is editor, with Rob Mclennan, of Poetics.ca.

He has a daughter and runs his own technical consulting business (B.I.T.C.) from his home.

Awards
 2005 Archibald Lampman Award for Fruitfly Geographic
 2017 Archibald Lampman Award for All of Us Reticent, Here, Together

Works
"Hyperbole for a large number", caterina, March 03, 2003
"April Violin"; "The History of Scribes"; "Kia", The Drunken boat, Vol.8, 2008 
"Draught" Trans Poetry, Ottawa
"Mark Bradley’s Plasma TV"; "Mark Bradley’s SUV"; "Dr. Plaza’s Idea"; "Scarecrow"; "Se Transformer en M. Busbib"; "Karikura’s Fiddle"; "Three Short Poems by Karikura", Sentinel Poetry #47, October 2006 
 
 
 
 
 Fruitfly Geographic

Anthologies

References

External links
"The Math in the Rhyme: Interview with Stephen Brockwell", Sentinel Poetry, Amatoritsero Ede, October 01, 2006

1963 births
Living people
20th-century Canadian poets
20th-century Canadian male writers
Canadian male poets
21st-century Canadian poets
Writers from Ottawa
21st-century Canadian male writers